Hradec Králové is a city of the Czech Republic. It has about 91,000 inhabitants. It is the capital of the Hradec Králové Region. The historic centre of Hradec Králové is well preserved and is protected by law as an urban monument reservation, the wider centre is protected as an urban monument zone.

Administrative parts

Hradec Králové is made up of 21 city parts:

Březhrad
Hradec Králové
Nový Hradec Králové
Kukleny
Malšova Lhota
Malšovice
Moravské Předměstí
Piletice
Plácky
Plačice
Plotiště nad Labem
Pouchov
Pražské Předměstí
Roudnička
Rusek
Slatina
Slezské Předměstí
Svinary
Svobodné Dvory
Třebeš
Věkoše

Etymology
The city was originally named Hradec, which is a diminutive of hrad (i.e. "castle"). Later, when it was owned by Bohemian queens, the Králové attribute (genitive of králová, "queen" in Old Czech) was added. So the name literally means "queen's castle".

Geography

Hradec Králové lies at the confluence of the Elbe and the Orlice rivers. It is located in the East Elbe Table flatland, in the eastern part of the Polabí lowlands. The municipal territory is rich in small fish ponds.

History

11th–16th centuries
The first written mention of a castle named Hradec is in Chronica Boemorum written in 1119–1125, when the record of the castle is associated with the year 1091. The document from 1073 that mentioned Hradec is a forgery from the 12th century. The first written mention of the settlement of Hradec is from 1225 and it was already referred to as a city. In 1306, Hradec became a dowry town ruled by Bohemian queens. It was the residence of Elizabeth Richeza of Poland in 1308–1318 or Elizabeth of Pomerania in 1378–1393. In the 14th century, thanks to the presence of the queens, the city became a military and political center of a region with a high level of education and culture.

Extensive fires in 1290, 1339 and 1407 accelerated the reconstruction of the city. In 1420, during the Hussite Wars, the city was conquered by the Hussites and became their military centre. In 1423, the Hussites completely destroyed the castle where the queens used to live. During the rule of King George of Poděbrady, the city experienced a new period of economic, political and cultural prosperity.

The development ended in 1547, when Hradec Králové joined the campaign against Emperor Ferdinand I, and as a result many of its properties were confiscated and its privileges were taken away. The city did not recover economically until the end of the 16th century. At this time, the houses were rebuilt in the Renaissance style.

17th–18th centuries
Hradec Králové was hit hard by the Thirty Years' War. It was conquered by the Swedish army in 1639 and several more times in the following years. At the end of the war, the city was depopulated and almost destroyed. However, the city recovered and in the 17th and early 18th century acquired a Baroque character. During the War of the Austrian Succession, the city was again involved in the war due to its strategic location.

In 1766, Joseph II decided to build a large modern military fortress in the city. Its construction changed the character of the city and its surroundings, some suburbs were demolished and the inhabitants moved into newly established settlements. A nearby hill was dismantled to build the massive walls and the riverbed of both the Elbe and the Orlice were changed. A complete defense infrastructure was built inside the walls. The fortress was finished in 1789 and occupied , but during its existence, it was never used in the war.

19th–20th centuries

In the mid-19th century, the industrialisation began and several industrial enterprises were founded inside the fortifications. The Battle of Königgrätz, the decisive battle of the Austro-Prussian War, took place on 3 July 1866 near Hradec Králové. This event is commemorated in the famous "Königgrätzer Marsch". Moreover, the battle put an end to the age of fortifications. The fortress was formally abolished in 1884 and gradually demolished between 1893 and 1914. The last remnants were demolished between 1929 and 1930.

In 1884, a then-unique international competition for the city's regulatory plan was announced. In the 1890s, several representative buildings (monastery, synagogue, high school, etc.) were built. Before the World War I, the harmonious development of the city and its high architectural level were influenced especially by the architect Jan Kotěra. In the 1920s, his pupil, another prominent Czech architect Josef Gočár, became the leading figure in the city's development, and his regulatory plan from 1926–1928 became the basis for the construction activity in the years to come. The urban development of Hradec Králové in the 1920s and 1930s was also appreciated abroad and the city was nicknamed the "Salon of the Republic".

Demographics

Economy

The largest industrial employers with headquarters in the city are ARROW International, a manufacturer of medical instruments and technology owned by Teleflex, and Trelleborg Bohemia, which focuses on the production of rubber and rubber products.

A traditional industry is the musical instrument manufacturing. Hradec Králové is known for the Petrof piano manufacturer, founded in 1864.

The largest non-industrial employer is the hospital.

Transport

Hradec Králové is located on the railway lines of regional importance Pardubice–Liberec and Prague–Trutnov.

Education

Hradec Králové serves as the educational centre of the region. The first school was founded here in 1362. Today the University of Hradec Králové, established in 2000, is located in the city. Charles University in Prague has two faculties in Hradec Králové: Faculty of Medicine and Faculty of Pharmacy. The University of Defense in Brno has its Faculty of Military Medicine in Hradec Králové.

Culture

The Klicpera's Theatre is one of the best regional drama theatres in the country. The puppet Drak Theatre is a world-class artistic institution.

The REGIONS International Theatre Festival Hradec Králové is an annual cultural event held in the city. It is one of the largest theatrical showcases in the country. It was founded in 1995 by the Klicpera Theatre.

Jazz Goes to Town is an international jazz festival, which has been held in Hradec Králové every October since 1995. Since 2003 the city hosts Hip Hop Kemp. It is the biggest hip hop festival in Central and Eastern Europe. Since 2007 the city hosts Rock for People, the biggest rock festival and one of the largest open-air music festivals in the Czech Republic.

The city is home to one of the Czech Republic's leading orchestras, the Hradec Králové Philharmonic Orchestra. It was established in 1978.

Religion
Hradec Králové is the seat of the Roman Catholic Diocese of Hradec Králové, established in 1664.

Sport
The ice hockey club of Hradec Králové is Mountfield HK, which plays in the Czech Extraliga.

The football club FC Hradec Králové plays in the Czech First League.

The women's basketball team, Hradecké Lvice, plays in the national women basketball league.

Sights

The historic city centre is located around the Velké Square, where all the most valuable historic buildings are located. The face of the modern city dates from the end of the 19th and the first half of the 20th century, when many monumental representative buildings in the Art Nouveau and Functionalism styles were built here.

The main landmark of Hradec Králové and the most important monument is the Cathedral of the Holy Spirit. The Church of the Holy Spirit was founded by Elizabeth Richeza in 1307, the two massive towers were added in 1360. It was promoted to a cathedral by Pope Alexander VII in 1664. It is the only Gothic church, which survived the construction of the fortress in the 18th century.

The originally Renaissance bell tower was built in 1574–1580 and completed in 1589. It includes the third biggest bell in Bohemia. Today the tower serves as a lookout tower and space for exhibitions.

The Church of Saint John of Nepomuk was built on the site of the former castle in 1710–1729. The interior contains valuable paintings from 1887, created in the Beuron Art School style.

The Museum of Eastern Bohemia in Hradec Králové was founded in 1880. The large museum building was designed by architect Jan Kotěra and built in 1909–1912. The museum has approximately 3,000,000 items in archeological, scientific and historical collections. One of the most valuable exhibits is the oldest surviving collections of Czech Renaissance polyphony, the Codex Speciálník manuscript.

Notable people

Elizabeth of Pomerania (c. 1347 – 1393), queen; lived and died here
Jan Šindel (1370s – c. 1456), scientist and professor
Cyprián Karásek Lvovický (1514–1574), astronomer and mathematician
Bohuslav Balbín (1621–1688), writer, historian and geographer
Václav Kliment Klicpera (1792–1859), playwright; lived and worked here
Carl von Rokitansky (1804–1878), physiologist, pathologist
Antonín Petrof (1839–1915), piano maker
František Plesnivý (1845–1918), architect
Viktor Mucha (1877–1933), dermatologist
Josef Gočár (1880–1945), architect
Josef Čapek (1887–1945), painter, writer, poet
Otakar Vávra (1911–2011), film director
Avigdor Dagan (1912–2006), Israeli diplomat
Jiří Horák (1924–2003), politician, first chairman of ČSSD
Václav Snítil (1928–2015), violinist
Jiří Petr (1931–2014), agroscientist, Rector Emeritus of CZU
Dušan Salfický (born 1972), ice hockey player
Sonja Vectomov (born 1979), Czech-Finnish electronic musician
Vít Jedlička (born 1983), politician and publicist
Kateřina Siniaková (born 1996), tennis player
Filip Hronek (born 1997), ice hockey player

Twin towns – sister cities

Hradec Králové is twinned with:

 Alessandria, Italy
 Arnhem, Netherlands
 Banská Bystrica, Slovakia
 Chernihiv, Ukraine
 Giessen, Germany
 Kaštela, Croatia
 Metz, France
 Wałbrzych, Poland
 Wrocław, Poland

Cooperation agreements
Hradec Králové also cooperates with:
 Montana, Bulgaria
 Székesfehérvár, Hungary

See also
New Hradec, North Dakota

References

External links

Tourist Information Centre Hradec Králové
Virtual show

 
Cities and towns in the Czech Republic
Populated places in Hradec Králové District
Populated riverside places in the Czech Republic
Populated places on the Elbe